|}

The Brown Advisory Novices' Chase is a Grade 1 National Hunt chase in Great Britain which is open to horses aged five years or older. It is run on the Old Course at Cheltenham over a distance of about 3 miles (3 miles and 80 yards, or 4,901 metres), and during its running there are twenty fences to be jumped. The race is for novice chasers, and it is scheduled to take place each year during the Cheltenham Festival in March.

History
The event was originally known as the Broadway Novices' Chase, and this became the race's registered title in 2021, but since the mid-1960s it has been run under various sponsored titles. From 1964 to 1973 it was sponsored by the Tote, and it was called the Totalisator Champion Novices' Chase. From 1974 to 2020 it was backed by the RSA Insurance Group, and its predecessors Sun Alliance (1974–1996) and Royal & SunAlliance (1997–2008). Since 2021 the race has been sponsored by Brown Advisory and Meriebelle Stable.

Several winners of the race have subsequently achieved victory in the most prestigious chase in the National Hunt calendar, the Cheltenham Gold Cup. The most recent was Lord Windermere, the winner of the latter event in 2014.

Records
Leading jockey since 1946 (5 wins):
 Pat Taaffe – Coneyburrow (1953), Solfen (1960), Grallagh Cnoc (1961), Arkle (1963), Proud Tarquin (1970)

Leading trainer since 1946 (5 wins):
 Willie Mullins – Florida Pearl (1998), Rule Supreme (2004), Cooldine (2009), Don Poli (2015), Monkfish (2021)

Winners since 1946
 Separate divisions of the race indicated by (1) and (2).

See also
 Horse racing in Great Britain
 List of British National Hunt races

References

 Racing Post:

 cheltenham.co.uk – Media information pack (2010).
 pedigreequery.com – Royal & SunAlliance Chase – Cheltenham.

External links
 Race Recordings 

National Hunt races in Great Britain
Cheltenham Racecourse
National Hunt chases